Glyphochloa is a genus of Indian plants in the grass family.

 Species

References

Andropogoneae
Poaceae genera
Endemic flora of India (region)